Hapalotremus is a genus of South American tarantulas in the Theraphosinae subfamily that was first described by Eugène Louis Simon in 1903. The tibial apophysis is branched twice (in males only), and there is a conspicuous subapical keel on the male's embolus.

Species
 it contains fourteen species, found in Argentina, Peru, and Bolivia:
Hapalotremus albipes Simon, 1903 (type) – Bolivia
Hapalotremus apasanka Sherwood, Ferretti, Gabriel & West, 2021 – Peru
Hapalotremus carabaya Ferretti, Cavalllo, Chaparro, Ríos-Tamayo, Seimon & West, 2018 – Peru
Hapalotremus chasqui Ferretti, Cavalllo, Chaparro, Ríos-Tamayo, Seimon & West, 2018 – Argentina
Hapalotremus chespiritoi Ferretti, Cavalllo, Chaparro, Ríos-Tamayo, Seimon & West, 2018 – Peru
Hapalotremus hananqheswa Sherwood, Ferretti, Gabriel & West, 2021 – Peru
Hapalotremus kaderkai Sherwood, Ferretti, Gabriel & West, 2021 – Peru
Hapalotremus kuka Ferretti, Cavalllo, Chaparro, Ríos-Tamayo, Seimon & West, 2018 – Bolivia
Hapalotremus major (Chamberlin, 1916) – Peru
Hapalotremus marcapata Ferretti, Cavalllo, Chaparro, Ríos-Tamayo, Seimon & West, 2018 – Peru
Hapalotremus martinorum Cavallo & Ferretti, 2015 – Argentina
Hapalotremus perezmilesi Ferretti, Cavalllo, Chaparro, Ríos-Tamayo, Seimon & West, 2018 – Peru
Hapalotremus vilcanota Ferretti, Cavalllo, Chaparro, Ríos-Tamayo, Seimon & West, 2018 – Peru
Hapalotremus yuraqchanka Sherwood, Ferretti, Gabriel & West, 2021 – Bolivia

See also
 List of Theraphosidae species

References

Further reading
Hapalotremus at Tarantupedia

Theraphosidae genera
Spiders of South America
Theraphosidae